Songs to Burn Your Bridges By is the fourth album by rock band Project 86. Originally released independently in November 2003 on the band's own label Team Black, the album was re-released on Tooth & Nail Records on June 1, 2004. In addition to a slightly re-ordered track listing, the re-release featured new artwork, three previously unreleased songs, and higher production quality.

Only 5,000 copies of the Team Black edition were pressed. For the "mother lode" pre-order of Picket Fence Cartel in 2009, one would receive one of only 300 copies the band still had in their possession.

Track listing 
 2003 Team Black release

 2004 Tooth & Nail release

Personnel 
Project 86
 Andrew Schwab – vocals
 Steven Dail – bass
 Randy Torres – guitar, vocals 
 Alex Albert – drums

Production
 Aaron Sprinkle – producer
 Matt Hyde – producer

References 

Project 86 albums
2004 albums
Tooth & Nail Records albums
Albums produced by Aaron Sprinkle